The Women's 500m Time Trial was one of the 6 women's events at the 2004 UCI Track Cycling World Championships, held in Melbourne, Australia.

17 Cyclists from 15 countries participated in the race. The Final was held on 30 May at 13:40.

World record

Final

References

Women's 500 m time trial
UCI Track Cycling World Championships – Women's 500 m time trial